Rankin Presbyterian Church is a historic church at 420 Clayton Street in Brush, Colorado.

It was built in 1907 and was added to the National Register in 2007. In 1963, an educational wing was added to the southwest corner of the building.

References

Presbyterian churches in Colorado
Churches on the National Register of Historic Places in Colorado
Gothic Revival church buildings in Colorado
Churches completed in 1907
Churches in Morgan County, Colorado
National Register of Historic Places in Morgan County, Colorado
1907 establishments in Colorado